This is a list of shipwrecks on the Great Lakes of North America that are listed on the National Register of Historic Places. The locations of National Register properties for which the latitude and longitude coordinates are included below, may be seen in an online map. This list includes shipwrecks that are located in the waters of Lake Superior, Lake Huron, Lake Michigan, Lake Erie and Lake Ontario. 

''This National Park Service list is complete through NPS recent listings

Lake Superior

|}

Lake Huron

|}

Lake Michigan

|}

Lake Erie

|}

Lake Ontario

|}

See also
List of shipwrecks on the Great Lakes
List of shipwrecks of western Lake Superior
List of shipwrecks in the Thunder Bay National Marine Sanctuary
List of storms on the Great Lakes

References

National Register of Historic Places
Great Lakes shipwrecks on the National Register of Historic Places
Great Lakes shipwrecks on the National Register of Historic Places
Great Lakes shipwrecks on the National Register of Historic Places
shipwrecks on the National Register of Historic Places